Kingsley House may refer to:
 Chester Kingsley House, Cambridge, Massachusetts, listed on the National Register of Historic Places (NRHP) in Massachusetts
 Kingsley House (Rehoboth, Massachusetts), listed on the NRHP in Massachusetts
 Edward D. Kingsley House, Portland, Oregon, listed on the NRHP in Oregon
 Kingsley Association, originally named Kingsley House, a settlement house in Pittsburgh, Pennsylvania